Linear B Ideograms is a Unicode block containing ideographic characters for writing Mycenaean Greek. Several Linear B ideographs double as syllabic letters, and are encoded in the Linear B Syllabary block.

Block

History
The following Unicode-related documents record the purpose and process of defining specific characters in the Linear B Ideograms block:

References 

Unicode blocks